The following is a list of bands or artists, past and present, who have had recordings released on the Volcano Entertainment imprint.

Volcano Entertainment began in 1996 as a joint venture with Zoo Entertainment.  In 1997, after absorbing Zoo and its artists onto the Volcano imprint, it merged with Rowdy Records to become Freeworld Entertainment.  That arrangement was short-lived and in early 1998 Freeworld Entertainment was bought by the then independent Zomba Group who reestablished the Volcano Entertainment name.

Artists

2 Skinnee J's
20 Fingers
311
Adam Jones
Akinyele
Gerald Alston
Alfonzo Blackwell
Artie the One Man Party
Bicycle
Box Set
Big Sister
James Brown
John Cafferty And The Beaver Brown Band
Cake
David Cassidy
Dixie Dregs
Danny Carey
Cause & Effect
Buck Clayton
The Comrads
Count Basie
Dogstar
Roy Eldridge
ELO Part II
Freddie Jackson
The Freddy Jones Band
Fiji Mariners Featuring Col. Bruce Hampton
Galactic
The Flag (David Cairns)
Leif Garrett
Dizzy Gillespie
Jerry Goldsmith
Gov't Mule
Great White
Green Jellÿ
Jimmy Hall
Hoodoo Gurus
John Lee Hooker
James Horner
Phyllis Hyman
The Interpreters
Trevor Jones
Sonny Landreth
Little Feat
Lusk
Lynyrd Skynyrd
Harvey Mason
Tim McGrath
Ian Moore
The Nylons
Odds
The O'Jays
Peach GB
Procol Harum
Screamin' Cheetah Wheelies
Billy Joe Shaver
Size 14
Skee-Lo
Survivor
Matthew Sweet
Sweet Sable
Syd Straw
Lysette Titi
To Kool Chris (Chris Chudzik)
Tool
Remy
Ronan Tynan
Ugly Americans
Sarah Vaughan
Vigilantes Of Love
"Weird Al" Yankovic
Widespread Panic
Young Dubliners

See also 
Volcano Entertainment
Freeworld Entertainment
Zoo Entertainment artists

Volcano Entertainment